The third season of the police procedural drama RIS Delitti Imperfetti was originally broadcast between January 15 and February 20, 2007 on Canale 5.

Plot 
Martinelli is promoted to captain and transferred to Messina. To make up for the absence, however, Francesca De Biase will arrive who, with her hilarity, will bring a breath of freshness to the Parma laboratories. Riccardo Venturi, after the loss of Anna, has become even more methodical and precise in his work. The Man of the Bombs, meanwhile, is in prison and is sentenced to life imprisonment and a regime of solitary confinement: however, it will be discovered that the affair is far from over. An anonymous package arrives at the RIS for Captain Venturi where, inside, kept in a box, there is a woman's finger recently amputated. Thanks to the ring, the group will go back to the victim and, once they arrive at the inspection in the woman's house, a DVD will be foundfor the captain. Inside is a video of a woman tied to a cot, gagged and forced to undergo hallucinating torture. Venturi thinks he's a serial killerand he is proved right when, thanks to the analysis of a larva found in the victim's house, they arrive in a wood and find the buried corpses of two different women: one already reduced to a skeleton and another recently dead. Scientists will understand that there is a new serial killer out there and that he has started a personal challenge with Captain Venturi, emulating the bomb man. During the series Venturi will have an affair with a journalist but, the latter, will be kidnapped and killed by the new serial killer. The autopsy leaves no doubt; the serial lets women die of starvation, in the most atrocious way possible, between torture and amputations in a former psychiatric hospital. The same serial will send a bomb package to Levi which, however, will explode in Venturi's hands, forcing him into a coma and leaving him with a serious problem in his hand that prevents him from keeping objects in balance. The new killer will even go to visit the captain while he is in the hospital. In the end it turns out that the serial killer is the psychiatrist who drew up the psychological profile of the man of the bombs: Carlo Vasari. It turns out that the man was the brother of a lesbian girl accused of killing his girlfriend with a tripod. Venturi had dealt with the case and had the girl arrested despite the fact that the real culprit was the brother who wanted to "punish" his sister's girlfriend for being an adulteress. Once arrested, Anna Maria Orazi (this is her sister's name) had had a psychic crisis and had been hospitalized in a psychiatric hospital (the same where the serial killer keeps his victims prisoner) where, refusing food, she was allowed to die of hardship. Vasari, before being discovered, kidnaps Francesca and keeps her prisoner first in a room of a country cottage and then, after the girl's awakening, in a labyrinth cave after having poisoned her with botulinum. In a fight with Venturi, Vasari is wounded by Marshal De Biase with a gunshot. Taken to the hospital he will go into a coma and, upon awakening, he will confess the place of Francesca's imprisonment to the man of the bombs before committing suicide in the hospital with a knife. L' Man of the Bombs will escort Venturi to the place where Francesca is but will escape and find death at the hands of Davide. Venturi goes down inside the cave and with his disabled hand breaks the unbreakable glass that separates him from Francesca and injects her with an antidote to the Botox that makes her wake up. Completely injured by the glass and ropes, Venturi manages to save little Francesca and take her to the hospital. The series ends with General Tosi who warns Venturi: if the problem in his hand is not solved, he will be forced to give the Venturi manages to save little Francesca and take her to the hospital. The series ends with General Tosi who warns Venturi: if the problem in his hand is not solved, he will be forced to give the Venturi manages to save little Francesca and take her to the hospital. The series ends with General Tosi who warns Venturi: if the problem in his hand is not solved, he will be forced to give thepermanent leave . Naturally, the simpler investigations taken from Italian news cases revolve around the history of the serial, such as crimes, serial rapists, kidnappings, armed robberies and "family murders".

Cast

Main 
Lorenzo Flaherty as Captain Riccardo Venturi
Romina Mondello as Lieutenant Giorgia Levi
Stefano Pesce as Lieutenant Davide Testi
Ugo Dighero as Sergeant Vincenco De Biase
Giulia Michelini as Sergeant Francesca De Biase
Gea Lionello as Dr. Claudia Morandi, ME
Paolo Maria Scalondro as Captain Eduardo Rocchi
Micaela Ramazzotti as Sara Nelli

Recurring 
Filippo Nigro as Captain Fabio Martinelli (episodes 1, 8 & 16)
Nino D' Agata as General Giacomo Tosi (entire season)
Leonardo Terviglio as Luca Grassi (episode 1)

Episodes

References 

2007 American television seasons